The 2004 Calgary Stampeders season was the 47th season for the team in the Canadian Football League and their 66th overall. The Stampeders finished in 5th place in the West Division with a 4–14 record and failed to make the playoffs. As of the 2022 season, this is the last time the Stampeders did not make the playoffs.

Offseason

CFL Draft

Preseason

Regular season

Season Standings

Season schedule

Awards and records

2004 CFL All-Stars
LB – John Grace

References

Calgary Stampeders seasons
Calgary Stampeders Season, 2004
2004 in Alberta